Basmane railway station is an intercity and regional railway terminal and rapid transit station in İzmir, Turkey. Along with Alsancak station, Basmane is one of two railway terminals in the city. All TCDD Taşımacılık trains terminate at this station, with intercity service to Ankara, Bandırma and Konya as well as regional service to Denizli, Söke, Tire and Ödemiş. The name originated from the Turkish phrase .

History

National railway station
When the Ottoman Railway Company built Alsancak Terminal, the demand for more railways in İzmir grew. On July 4, 1863, the Smyrna Cassaba Railway (SCR) was chartered to build a line from İzmir to Turgutlu (then Cassaba). The railway chose to have their terminal close to the city center. Construction of the station began in 1864 and completed in 1866. The station opened on October 25, 1866. The SCR used the station for passenger and freight operations, with a freight depot in the back of the station. During World War I, the station along with the railway was put under Ottoman military control. After the war and the Republic of Turkey formed, the station was still under SCR control until 1934, when the Turkish State Railways (TCDD) absorbed the SCR. TCDD continues to operate the station to the present. In 2001 the tracks were electrified, but never used. In 2006 the station was renovated and closed to passenger service. In 2009 passenger service returned.

Underground station
Underground station is on the Fahrettin Altay—Evka 3 Line of the İzmir Metro in Konak. Located directly under the national railway station, it is one of the ten original stations of the metro system. Connection to TCDD Taşımacılık inter-city and regional trains are available above ground as well as ESHOT city bus service. Basmane is the only station offering a direct connection to intercity and regional train service on the metro system since 2016, when TCDD Taşımacılık trains bypassed Halkapınar. The station is constructed in a way all entrance and exit is done through national railway station above.

Basmane station was opened on 22 May 2000.

Connections
ESHOT operates city bus service on Gazi Avenue and Fevzipaşa Avenue.

Nearby Places of Interest
Kültürpark

References

See also
Basmane Metro Station
İzmir Metro
İZBAN
Rail transport in İzmir

External links

İzmir Basmane station on trainsofturkey.com
Basmane tren garı(Turkish)

1866 establishments in the Ottoman Empire
Buildings and structures in İzmir
Railway stations in İzmir Province
Railway stations opened in 1866
Konak District